Harasam may refer to:
Qaleh-ye Harasam
Harasam Rural District